Kamla Kumari  was an Indian politician. She was elected to the Lok Sabha, lower house of the Parliament of India from Palamu, Bihar as a member of the Indian National Congress.

References

Indian National Congress politicians
Lok Sabha members from Bihar
India MPs 1967–1970
1937 births
India MPs 1971–1977
India MPs 1980–1984
India MPs 1984–1989
Living people
People from Palamu district
People from Ranchi
Women members of the Lok Sabha